Suresh Urs is an Indian film editor who works predominantly in the South Indian cinema. He has edited over 700 films and 40 documentaries and television shows. Urs is well known for his association with directors like Girish Karnad, Mani Ratnam, Shankar Nag, T. S. Nagabharana, Girish Kasaravalli, P. Vasu, Bala, Saran and Baraguru Ramachandrappa. He was awarded the National Film Award for Best Editing for his work in Bombay (1995), he is also a recipient of five Karnataka State Film Awards and two Tamil Nadu State Film Awards. He was also honored to win the  Karnataka State Rajyotsava Prashasti.
Lifetime Achievement Vishnuvardhan Award from Karnataka Government in 2014.

Early life 
Suresh Urs was born in Kolagala, H.D.Kote taluk, Karnataka to K C Chamaraje Urs, a farmer, and Devajammanni.

Awards 
 National Film Awards
 1995: Best Editing: Bombay
 Karnataka State Film Awards
 2010-11: Best Editing:  Aidondla Aidu
 2007-08: Best Editing:  Savi Savi Nenapu
 1991-92: Best Editing:  Mysooru Mallige
 1989-90: Best Editing:  Panchama Veda
 1980-81: Best Editing:  Mooru Daarigalu

Partial filmography

References

External links
 

Best Editor National Film Award winners
Tamil film editors
Living people
Tamil Nadu State Film Awards winners
Year of birth missing (living people)
Kannada film editors
Film editors from Karnataka
Recipients of the Rajyotsava Award 2007
Telugu film editors